David Grimes may refer to:
David Grimes (American football) (born 1986), American football wide receiver
David Grimes (composer) (born 1948), American composer
David Grimes (politician) (born 1953), American politician from Alabama
David Grimes (physician) (born 1947), American physician and abortion provider
David Robert Grimes (born 1985), physicist and cancer researcher at the University of Oxford
David Grimes (meteorologist), Canadian meteorologist
David Grimes (skier), American skier